Nottingham Free School is a co-educational free school which serves the areas of Sherwood, Carrington, Mapperley Park, Woodthorpe and Mapperley. The school is located in a former factory —the Courtaulds building— on Haydn Road and first opened in September 2014 with an intake of seventy-nine Year 7 students, a number which has grown to nearly 600 pupils ranging from Year 7 to Year 13.

In August 2019, the first group of students to join the school received their GCSE results.

References

Secondary schools in Nottingham
Free schools in England
Educational institutions established in 2014
2014 establishments in England